Magüi Serna was the defending champion from 2003, but chose not to compete in 2004.

Jelena Janković won this title, defeating Martina Suchá in the final in straight sets, 7–6(7–4), 6–3.

Seeds

  Émilie Loit (withdrew)
  Petra Mandula (quarterfinals)
  Anikó Kapros (quarterfinals)
  Anca Barna (first round)
  Barbara Schett (second round)
  Iveta Benešová (semifinals)
  Arantxa Parra Santonja (second round)
  Jelena Janković (winner)
  Melinda Czink (first round)

Draw

Finals

Top half

Bottom half

References

Tippmix Budapest Grand Prix - Singles
Budapest Grand Prix